Qadas (also Cadasa) was a Palestinian village located 17 kilometers northeast of Safad that was depopulated during the 1948 Arab-Israeli war. One of seven Shia Muslim villages, called Metawalis, that fell within the boundaries of British Mandate Palestine, Qadas is today known as the tell of the ancient biblical city of Kedesh. The village of Qadas contained many natural springs which served as the village water supply and a Roman temple dating back to the 2nd century AD.

The village was razed following its depopulation, and is today known as the archaeological site of Tel Kedesh.

History

Ancient period 

Qadas is the site of the ancient biblical city of Kedesh. Kedesh Naphtali is mentioned in the Book of Joshua as a Canaanite citadel conquered by the Israelites; later, it became a city of refuge belonging to the Tribe of Naphtali. In the 8th century BCE, during the reign of Pekah king of Israel, Tiglath-Pileser III of the Neo-Assyrian Empire captured Kedesh and deported its inhabitants to Mesopotamia.

Classical antiquity 
In classical antiquity, Kedesh was known as Qadasa. In 259 BCE, Kedesh was mentioned in the Zenon Papyri. According to 1 Maccabees, a battle between Jonathan Maccabeus and the Seleucid king Demetrius II Nicator took place in Kedesh.

According to Josephus, after the Jews were massacred in Caesarea in 66 CE, they avenged by attacking a series of gentile cities, including Qadasa, which was then controlled by the Tyrians. During the First Jewish-Roman War, Titus established his camp there prior to his departure for battle with John of Gischala.

Archaeological excavations conducted at Kedesh have shown that the town had prospered in the second and third centuries CE, and a large Roman temple complex was built there.

Middle ages 

Under the rule of the Islamic Abbasid Caliphate in the 10th century CE, Qadas was a town in Jund al-Urrdun ("District of Jordan"). According to al-Muqaddasi in 985, "Qadas was a small town on the slope of the mountain. It is 'full of good things'. Jabal Amilah is the district which is in its neighborhood. The town possesses three springs from which the people drink, and they have a bath below the city. The mosque is in the market, and in its court is a palm tree. The climate of this place is very hot. Near Qadas is the (Hulah) Lake."

The 14th-century Jewish traveller Ishtori Haparchi wrote of Kedesh: "About half a day's distance southward of Paneas, known in Arabic as Banias, is Kedesh, in the mountain of Naphtali, and it is [now] called Qades."

Ottoman era
In 1517, Qadas was incorporated into the Ottoman Empire after it was captured from the Mamluks, and by 1596, it was under the administration of the nahiya ("subdistrict") of Tibnin, under Sanjak Safad. It paid taxes on wheat, barley, olives, cotton, orchards, beehives, and goats, as well as a press that processed either grapes or olives.

Victor Guérin visited in 1875,  and described the most  important ruins there.

In 1881, the PEF's Survey of Western Palestine (SWP), Qadas was described as a stone-built village, situated on a spur of a ridge. The population, which was estimated to be between 100 and 300, cultivated fig and olive trees.  SWP also noted that the "Metawali" from Qadas went  to nearby  Al-Nabi Yusha'  to venerate the name of Joshua.

British Mandate era
Qadas was a part of the French-controlled Lebanon until 1923, when the British Mandate of Palestine's borders were delineated to include it.

Rainfall and the abundance of springs allowed the village to develop a prosperous agricultural economy based on grain, fruit, and olives.

In the 1931 census of Palestine, conducted by the British Mandate authorities, Qadas  had a population of  273; 1 Christian and 272 Muslims,  in  a total of 56 houses.

In  the 1945 statistics the village had a total of 5,709 dunums of land allotted to cereals, while 156 dunums were irrigated or used for orchards.

1948 war, and aftermath
Qadas was occupied by Israeli forces during Operation Yiftach on 28 May 1948. Defended by the Arab Liberation Army and the Lebanese army, its inhabitants fled under the influence of the fall of, or exodus from, neighbouring towns.

In June, 1948, kibbutz  Manara requested land from the newly depopulated village of Qadas, as it was "suitable for winter crops."

The settlement of Yiftach  was built in 1948 to the northeast of the village site on lands belonging to Qadas. The village land is also used by the settlements of Malkiyya, founded in 1949, and Ramot Naftali, established in 1945.

Walid Khalidi described the remaining structures of the former village in 1992 as follows:"Stones from the destroyed houses are strewn over the fenced-in site, and a few partially destroyed walls near the spring are visible. The flat portions of the surrounding lands are planted with apple trees; the spring provides drinking water for cattle.

Hassan Nasrallah, the secretary-general of Hezbollah, has publicly recalled on occasion the fate of Qadas and the other Metawali villages in his references to the 1948 annexation of several Lebanese villages, the expulsion of their residents, the expropriation of their property and the destruction of their homes.

The Lebanese government demands the return of the village.

See also
Shia villages in Palestine
Tel Kedesh

References

Bibliography

 (SWP I, pp. 226-227)
  
  

 

 
   (p. 70)

External links
Welcome the Qadas
Qadas, Zochrot
Survey of Western Palestine, Map 4:  IAA, SWP Wikimedia commons
Qadas, from the Khalil Sakakini Cultural Center
Villages of Palestine - Qadas,   Dr. Khalil Rizk

District of Safad
Arab villages depopulated during the 1948 Arab–Israeli War